Evidence-Based Complementary and Alternative Medicine is a peer-reviewed open-access medical journal covering complementary and alternative medicine published by Hindawi Publishing Corporation.

History
The journal was established in 2004 by Edwin L. Cooper, who also served as its editor-in-chief until 2010, when the journal moved from Oxford University Press to Hindawi.

Initially, the journal was entirely open access, without publication charge to the authors except for color figures, but Oxford University Press changed its policy in 2008 and made reviews, editorials, and commentaries subscription-based, while maintaining open access for original research papers. Hindawi returned the journal to a full open access model, but authors have to pay an article processing charge.

According to the Journal Citation Reports, the journal has a 2021 impact factor of 2.650.

Criticism
One of the founding editors, Edzard Ernst, has described the journal as "useless rubbish", primarily due to ineffective peer review.

References

External links

Alternative and traditional medicine journals
Publications established in 2004
Quarterly journals
Hindawi Publishing Corporation academic journals
Open access journals
English-language journals